Courtney Belle Neale (born 4 July 1998) is an Australian cricketer who plays as a right-arm medium-fast bowler and right-handed batter. She played in three matches for Melbourne Renegades in the 2020–21 WBBL season and three matches for Victoria in the 2020–21 WNCL season. She was in the Western Australia squad for the 2021–22 WNCL season before reluctantly terminating her contract due to covid border closures.

References

External links

Courtney Neale at Cricket Australia

1998 births
Living people
Cricketers from Victoria (Australia)
Sportswomen from Victoria (Australia)
Australian women cricketers
Melbourne Renegades (WBBL) cricketers
Victoria women cricketers